The highest-selling singles in Australia are ranked in the Australian Recording Industry Association singles chart, also known as the ARIA Charts, published by the Australian Recording Industry Association (ARIA). The data are compiled from a sample that includes music stores, music departments at electronics and department stores and Internet sales, in other words, both digital as well as CD sales.

In January 2010, the Australian Recording Industry Association released a chart with the highest selling singles of the previous decade, using data from all 520 ARIA singles charts from 1 January 2000, to 31 December 2009.

The winner of the first season of Australian Idol, Guy Sebastian, had the highest-selling single of the decade, "Angels Brought Me Here", which reached number one on the ARIA singles chart on 1 December 2003, and remained there for 3 weeks. It was followed by "The Prayer" by Anthony Callea, the runner up of the show's second season. It reached number one, and remained there for 5 weeks.

All but 23 of the 100 songs that made the end-of-decade chart reached number one during the decade.

Top 100

See also
List of best-selling albums of the 2000s in Australia

References

2000s
Australian record charts
2000s in Australian music